Merritt 7 station is a commuter rail stop on the Danbury Branch of the Metro-North Railroad's New Haven Line, located in Norwalk, Connecticut. Merritt 7 is named after an adjacent business park based near the intersection of the Merritt Parkway and Route 7.

Station layout
The station has one four-car-long low-level side platform to the west of the single track.

The station has 88 parking spaces, all of which are owned by the state and is owned and operated by the Connecticut Department of Transportation (ConnDOT).

History 

The Merritt 7 corporate park built the station while separating the station from building entrances by a fence to make the complex transit adjacent but not transit-oriented. The station was opened on July 29, 1985 by Metro-North. At the time of its opening, it was the only privately built rail station in Connecticut. Construction of the station cost $750,000.

The station is planned to be rebuilt with a  six-car-long high-level platform on the west side of the tracks, slightly north of the existing station. The new station will have a full-length canopy and an accessible pedestrian overpass with elevators. Bidding took place in April–June 2020. Completion of the station is scheduled for 2022.

References

External links

Bureau of Public Transportation of the Connecticut Department of Transportation, "Condition Inspection for the Merritt 7 Station" report dated August 2002

Metro-North Railroad stations in Connecticut
Buildings and structures in Norwalk, Connecticut
Stations along New York, New Haven and Hartford Railroad lines
Railway stations in the United States opened in 1985
Railroad stations in Fairfield County, Connecticut
1985 establishments in Connecticut